Gyraulus rossmaessleri is a small species of freshwater snail, an aquatic pulmonate gastropod mollusk in the family Planorbidae, the ram's horn snails.

Distribution
The distribution of this species is Holarctic. It occurs in countries and islands including:
 Germany - critically endangered (vom Aussterben bedroht)

Habitat
This small snail lives on water plants in freshwater.

Shell description
The  shell is nearly planispiral in its coiling.

References

ross
Molluscs of Europe